Robert Terry Wilson (born October 4, 1949) is an American bass player, record producer and composer.

Biography
He was born in Warren, Arkansas, United States. In the late 1960s, he started as a professional musician, playing bass for bands/artists such as Blackwell, Bloontz, John Martyn amongst others. In 1975, he became a member of the rock band Back Street Crawler. Around this time he also worked with Johnny Nash, John Bundrick, Speedy Keen, Paul Travis, Shusha, Sue Glover, Paul Kossoff, Eddie Quansah, No Slack, Mark Ashton, Geoff Whitehorn and others.

In 1981–1982, he played bass for Eric Burdon on the album Comeback and on live shows, as well as the Rockpalast concert. He was also credited on many later released compilations of Burdon and as the composer of The Animals's 1983 reggae/rock-single, "Love is for all Time" (which was performed in the live shows of his wife, Teresa James).

Throughout the 1980s and the 1990s, he worked with Gary Dayton Hill, Johnny Nash, Darling Cruel, Kimm Rogers, Alejandro Escovedo, Stephen Bruton, Little Whisper, Maria Muldaur, Storyville, Tamara Champlin, Bill Champlin, Juice Newton, Mark Sebastian, Big Trouble and others.

In the new millennium, he also worked/toured/wrote for – or is credited on records by – Gary Dayton Hill, Kathy Mattea, Chuck E. Weiss, Jack's Mannequin, Ana Popovic, Dallas Hodge, JD & the Straight Shot, his wife Teresa James and Eric Burdon for which he has been a permanent band member since 2009.

In 1980, he had a small role in the movie UFOria, starring Fred Ward and Harry Dean Stanton.

Discography
Blackwell: Blackwell (Atco Records, 1969)
Bloontz: Bloontz (Evolution Records, 1972) 
Johnny Nash: Celebrate Life (CBS Records, 1974) 
John "Rabbit" Bundrick Dark Saloon (Island Records, 1974) 
Speedy Keen Y Know Wot I Mean? (Island Records, 1975) 
Shusha Guppy Before the Deluge (1975) 
Paul Travis Return of the Native (1974) 
John Martyn Sunday's Child (Island Records, 1975) 
Eddie Quansah Che Che Cuelee (1975) 
Back Street Crawler The Band Plays On (Atlantic Records, 1975) 
Back Street Crawler 2nd Street (Atlantic Records, 1976) 
Crawler Crawler (CBS Records, 1977) 
Crawler Snake, Rattle & Roll (CBS Records, 1978)
Blaze Foley "If I Could Only Fly" (producer, Zephyr Records, 1979) 
Eric Burdon "Comeback" / "Crawling King Snake" 
Stephen Bruton What It Is (Dos Records, 1993)
Stephen Bruton Right on Time (Dos Records, 1995)
Paul Kossoff Blue Soul (1986) 
Teresa James The Whole Enchilada (2003) 
Alejandro Escovedo Gravity (1992) 
Alejandro Escovedo Thirteen Years (1994) 
Storyville Bluest Eyes (1993) 
Teresa James Oh Yeah! (Black & Tan Records 2003) 
Teresa James & the Rhythm Tramps The Rhythm Method (Jesilu Records, 2005)
Teresa James & the Rhythm Tramps The Bottom Line (New Light Ent. Records, 2007)
Jodie Siegal "Stepping Stone" (2007 Produced) 
Cynthia Jones And West Coast Highlights (Produced 2008) 
Danny Everitt Cold Wind Cold Rain (Produced 2007) 
Eric Burdon My Secret Life (2004)
Eric Burdon Soul of a Man (2006)
Ana Popović Still Making History (Delta Groove Productions, 2007)
Eric Burdon 'Til Your River Runs Dry (2013)
Teresa James & the Rhythm Tramps Live! (2019)

References

External links
 

1949 births
Living people
American bass guitarists
Record producers from Texas
People from Deer Park, Texas
Guitarists from Texas
Guitarists from Arkansas
Back Street Crawler (band) members
Crawler (band) members
Record producers from Arkansas